The 2019–20 Atlanta Hawks season was the 71st season of the franchise in the National Basketball Association (NBA) and the 52nd in Atlanta.

This was the first time since the 2013–14 season that did not include Kent Bazemore on the roster, as he was traded to the Portland Trail Blazers for Evan Turner. This also marks the 22nd and final season that Vince Carter plays in the NBA, becoming the longest-tenured player in NBA history, as well as the first to play in 4 different decades. Carter was also the last remaining active player who was drafted and had played in the 1990s.

The season was suspended by the league officials following the games of March 11 after it was reported that Rudy Gobert tested positive for COVID-19.  On June 4, 2020, it was announced by the NBA Board of Governors approved a plan that would restart the season with 22 teams returning to play in the NBA Bubble on July 31, 2020, which was approved by the National Basketball Players Association the next day. The Hawks, with the league's fourth-worst record at the time of the season's suspension, were not among them, effectively ending the team's season.

Draft picks

The Atlanta Hawks held two first round pick and three second round draft picks before entering the NBA draft lottery. On the night of the draft lottery, both their own first round pick and the pick acquired from the Dallas Mavericks the prior season fell down to become the Hawks' 8th and 10th selections of the draft, respectively. On June 6, the Hawks agreed to also acquire the 17th pick of the draft from the Brooklyn Nets alongside a future first round pick and Allen Crabbe in exchange for Taurean Prince and a 2020 second round pick. Before the night of the 2019 NBA draft, the Hawks traded the 44th pick of the draft to the Miami Heat for a conditional 2024 second round pick and cash considerations.

On the night of the draft, the Hawks agreed to a trade where they gave away picks 8, 17, and 35 to the New Orleans Pelicans in exchange for Solomon Hill, as well as the fourth pick of the draft (which became forward De'Andre Hunter from the University of Virginia), the 57th selection, and a future second round pick. They also selected small forward Cam Reddish from Duke with their second selection in the top 10, as well as Angolan power forward Bruno Fernando from the University of Maryland with their last selection the Hawks kept.

Roster

Standings

Division

Conference

Game log

Preseason 

|- style="background:#fcc;"
| 1
| October 7
| New Orleans
| 
| DeAndre' Bembry (16)
| Collins, Jones, Brown Jr., Parker (5)
| Trae Young (11)
| State Farm Arena15,441
| 0–1
|- style="background:#fcc;"
| 2
| October 9
| Orlando
| 
| Trae Young (18)
| Jabari Parker (9)
| Young, Goodwin (5)
| State Farm Arena10,945
| 0–2
|- style="background:#fcc;"
| 3
| October 14
| @ Miami
| 
| Trae Young (23)
| Jabari Parker (10)
| Young, Hunter (4)
| American Airlines Arena19,600
| 0–3
|- style="background:#cfc;"
| 4
| October 16
| @ New York
| 
| Trae Young (23)
| John Collins (14)
| Trae Young (9)
| Madison Square Garden19,812
| 1–3
|- style="background:#fcc;"
| 5
| October 17
| @ Chicago
| 
| Jabari Parker (15)
| Len (11)
| Len, Young, Turner (4)
| United Center18,277
| 1–4

Regular season 

|- style="background:#cfc;"
| 1
| October 24
| @ Detroit
| 
| Trae Young (38)
| John Collins (10)
| Trae Young (9)
| Little Caesars Arena20,332
| 1–0
|- style="background:#cfc;"
| 2
| October 26
| Orlando
| 
| Trae Young (39)
| John Collins (12)
| Trae Young (9)
| State Farm Arena17,078
| 2–0
|- style="background:#fcc;"
| 3
| October 28
| Philadelphia
| 
| Trae Young (25)
| De'Andre Hunter (9)
| Trae Young (9)
| State Farm Arena14,094
| 2–1
|- style="background:#fcc;"
| 4
| October 29
| @ Miami
| 
| John Collins (30)
| John Collins (7)
| Cam Reddish (6)
| American Airlines Arena19,600
| 2–2
|- style="background:#fcc;"
| 5
| October 31
| Miami
| 
| Jabari Parker (23) 
| DeAndre' Bembry (10)
| DeAndre' Bembry (8)
| State Farm Arena16,539
| 2–3

|- style="background:#cfc;"
| 6
| November 5
| San Antonio
| 
| Trae Young (29)
| Parker, Hunter (8)
| Trae Young (13)
| State Farm Arena14,025
| 3–3
|- style="background:#fcc;"
| 7
| November 6
| Chicago
| 
| Jabari Parker (18)
| Bruno Fernando (6)
| DeAndre' Bembry (4)
| State Farm Arena15,049
| 3–4
|- style="background:#fcc;"
| 8
| November 8
| Sacramento
| 
| Trae Young (30)
| Jabari Parker (8)
| Trae Young (12)
| State Farm Arena16,447
| 3–5
|- style="background:#fcc;"
| 9
| November 10
| @ Portland
| 
| Trae Young (35)
| Jabari Parker (11)
| Trae Young (10)
| Moda Center20,041
| 3–6
|- style="background:#cfc;"
| 10
| November 12
| @ Denver
| 
| Trae Young (42)
| Jabari Parker (9)
| Trae Young (11)
| Pepsi Center18,327
| 4–6
|- style="background:#fcc;"
| 11
| November 14
| @ Phoenix
| 
| Jabari Parker (24)
| Alex Len (10)
| Trae Young (13)
| Talking Stick Resort Arena15,143
| 4–7
|- style="background:#fcc;"
| 12
| November 16
| @ L. A. Clippers
| 
| Trae Young (20)
| Jabari Parker (8)
| Trae Young (6)
| Staples Center19,068
| 4–8
|- style="background:#fcc;"
| 13
| November 17
| @ L. A. Lakers
| 
| Trae Young (31)
| Jabari Parker (8)
| Trae Young (7)
| Staples Center18,997
| 4–9
|- style="background:#fcc;"
| 14
| November 20
| Milwaukee
| 
| De'Andre Hunter (27)
| De'Andre Hunter (11)
| Trae Young (8)
| State Farm Arena16,441
| 4–10
|- style="background:#fcc;"
| 15
| November 22
| @ Detroit
| 
| DeAndre' Bembry (22)
| Trae Young (6)
| Trae Young (8)
| Little Caesars Arena15,399
| 4–11
|- style="background:#fcc;"
| 16
| November 23
| Toronto
| 
| Trae Young (30)
| Trae Young (10) 
| Trae Young (10) 
| State Farm Arena16,931
| 4–12
|- style="background:#fcc;"
| 17
| November 25
| Minnesota
| 
| Trae Young (37)
| Parker, Crabbe (7)
| Trae Young (9)
| State Farm Arena16,218
| 4–13
|- style="background:#fcc;"
| 18
| November 27
| @ Milwaukee
| 
| Jabari Parker (33)
| Jabari Parker (14)
| Trae Young (7)
| Fiserv Forum17,525
| 4–14
|- style="background:#fcc;"
| 19
| November 29
| @ Indiana
| 
| Trae Young (49)
| DeAndre' Bembry (12)
| Trae Young (6)
| Bankers Life Fieldhouse15,827
| 4–15
|- style="background:#fcc;"
| 20
| November 30
| @ Houston
| 
| Trae Young (37)
| Bembry, Hunter (5)
| Trae Young (7)
| Toyota Center18,055
| 4–16

|- style="background:#cfc;"
| 21
| December 2
| Golden State
| 
| Trae Young (24)
| Bembry, Jones (8)
| Trae Young (7)
| State Farm Arena14,278
| 5–16
|- style="background:#fcc;"
| 22
| December 4
| Brooklyn
| 
| Trae Young (39)
| Damian Jones (8)
| Trae Young (10)
| State Farm Arena15,694
| 5–17
|- style="background:#cfc;"
| 23
| December 8
| @ Charlotte
| 
| Trae Young (30)
| Alex Len (10)
| Trae Young (9)
| Spectrum Center15,489
| 6–17
|- style="background:#fcc;"
| 24
| December 10
| @ Miami
| 
| De'Andre Hunter (28)
| Parker, Reddish (7)
| Trae Young (9)
| American Airlines Arena19,600
| 6–18
|- style="background:#fcc;"
| 25
| December 11
| @ Chicago
| 
| Alex Len (17)
| Jabari Parker (7)
| Trae Young (13)
| United Center15,084
| 6–19
|- style="background:#fcc;"
| 26
| December 13
| Indiana
| 
| Trae Young (23)
| Alex Len (13)
| Trae Young (8)
| State Farm Arena15,121
| 6–20
|- style="background:#fcc;"
| 27
| December 15
| L. A. Lakers
| 
| Trae Young (30)
| Alex Len (7)
| Trae Young (7)
| State Farm Arena16,962
| 6–21
|- style="background:#fcc;"
| 28
| December 17
| @ New York
| 
| Trae Young (42)
| Len, Parker, Hunter (5)
| Trae Young (8)
| Madison Square Garden18,268
| 6–22
|- style="background:#fcc;"
| 29
| December 19
| Utah
| 
| Trae Young (30)
| Jabari Parker (9)
| Trae Young (8)
| State Farm Arena16,739
| 6–23
|- style="background:#fcc;"
| 30
| December 21
| @ Brooklyn
| 
| Trae Young (47)
| Alex Len (14)
| Huerter, Young (6)
| Barclays Center16,496
| 6–24
|- style="background:#fcc;"
| 31
| December 23
| @ Cleveland
| 
| Trae Young (30)
| John Collins (10)
| Trae Young (11)
| Rocket Mortgage FieldHouse18,007
| 6–25
|- style="background:#fcc;"
| 32
| December 27
| Milwaukee
| 
| Allen Crabbe (20)
| John Collins (16)
| Kevin Huerter (3)
| State Farm Arena17,358
| 6–26
|- style="background:#fcc;"
| 33
| December 28
| @ Chicago
| 
| John Collins (34)
| John Collins (8)
| Cam Reddish (6)
| United Center21,496
| 6–27
|- style="background:#cfc;"
| 34
| December 30
| @ Orlando
| 
| Brandon Goodwin (21)
| Alex Len (12)
| Brandon Goodwin (6)
| Amway Center17,784
| 7–27

|- style="background:#fcc;"
| 35
| January 3
| @ Boston
| 
| Trae Young (28)
| Collins, Len (8)
| Trae Young (10)
| TD Garden19,156
| 7–28
|- style="background:#cfc;"
| 36
| January 4
| Indiana
| 
| Trae Young (41)
| Alex Len (9)
| Trae Young (8)
| State Farm Arena16,420
| 8–28
|- style="background:#fcc;"
| 37
| January 6
| Denver
| 
| Trae Young (29)
| Kevin Huerter (8)
| Trae Young (12)
| State Farm Arena15,286
| 8–29
|- style="background:#fcc;"
| 38
| January 8
| Houston
| 
| Trae Young (42)
| John Collins (14)
| Trae Young (10)
| State Farm Arena16,514
| 8–30
|- style="background:#fcc;"
| 39
| January 10
| @ Washington
| 
| Trae Young (19)
| John Collins (15)
| Trae Young (7)
| Capital One Arena16,360
| 8–31
|- style="background:#fcc;"
| 40
| January 12
| @ Brooklyn
| 
| Cam Reddish (20)
| Collins, Huerter, Jones (5)
| Kevin Huerter (5)
| Barclays Center15,201
| 8–32
|- style="background:#cfc;"
| 41
| January 14
| Phoenix
| 
| Trae Young (36)
| Kevin Huerter (15)
| Trae Young (10)
| State Farm Arena16,060
| 9–32
|- style="background:#cfc;"
| 42
| January 17
| @ San Antonio
| 
| Trae Young (31)
| John Collins (10)
| Trae Young (9)
| AT&T Center18,354
| 10–32
|- style="background:#fcc;"
| 43
| January 18
| Detroit
| 
| John Collins (20)
| Trae Young (8)
| Teague, Young (7)
| State Farm Arena17,056
| 10–33
|- style="background:#fcc;"
| 44
| January 20
| Toronto
| 
| Trae Young (42)
| John Collins (11)
| Trae Young (15)
| State Farm Arena17,300
| 10–34
|- style="background:#cfc;"
| 45
| January 22
| L. A. Clippers
| 
| John Collins (33)
| John Collins (16)
| Jeff Teague (8)
| State Farm Arena14,338
| 11–34
|- style="background:#fcc;"
| 46
| January 24
| @ Oklahoma City
| 
| John Collins (28)
| Collins, Huerter, Reddish (6)
| Trae Young (16)
| Chesapeake Energy Arena18,203
| 11–35
|- style="background:#cfc;"
| 47
| January 26
| Washington
| 
| Trae Young (45)
| Bruno Fernando (12)
| Trae Young (14)
| State Farm Arena15,567
| 12–35
|- style="background:#fcc;"
| 48
| January 28
| @ Toronto
| 
| John Collins (28)
| John Collins (12)
| Trae Young (13)
| Scotiabank Arena19,800
| 12–36
|- style="background:#cfc;"
| 49
| January 30
| Philadelphia
| 
| Trae Young (39)
| John Collins (20)
| Trae Young (18)
| State Farm Arena15,227
| 13–36

|- style="background:#fcc;"
| 50
| February 1
| @ Dallas
| 
| John Collins (26)
| Damian Jones (12)
| Jeff Teague (8)
| American Airlines Center20,328
| 13–37
|- style="background:#fcc;"
| 51
| February 3
| Boston
| 
| Trae Young (34)
| John Collins (11)
| Trae Young (7)
| State Farm Arena16,231
| 13–38
|- style="background:#cfc;"
| 52
| February 5
| @ Minnesota
| 
| Trae Young (38)
| John Collins (12)
| Trae Young (11)
| Target Center10,779
| 14–38
|- style="background:#fcc;"
| 53
| February 7
| @ Boston
| 
| John Collins (30)
| John Collins (10)
| Kevin Huerter (6)
| TD Garden19,156
| 14–39
|- style="background:#cfc;"
| 54
| February 9
| New York
| 
| Trae Young (48)
| John Collins (16)
| Trae Young (13)
| State Farm Arena16,309
| 15–39
|- style="background:#fcc;"
| 55
| February 10
| @ Orlando
| 
| Trae Young (29)
| Dewayne Dedmon (9)
| Jeff Teague (11)
| Amway Center17,076
| 15–40
|- style="background:#fcc;"
| 56
| February 12
| @ Cleveland
| 
| Trae Young (27)
| De'Andre Hunter (8)
| Trae Young (12)
| Rocket Mortgage FieldHouse16,200
| 15–41
|- style="background:#cfc;"
| 57
| February 20
| Miami
| 
| Trae Young (50)
| Dewayne Dedmon (8)
| Trae Young (8)
| State Farm Arena17,356
| 16–41
|- style="background:#cfc;"
| 58
| February 22
| Dallas
| 
| John Collins (35)
| John Collins (17)
| Trae Young (10)
| State Farm Arena17,050
| 17–41
|- style="background:#fcc;"
| 59
| February 24
| @ Philadelphia
| 
| Trae Young (28)
| John Collins (9)
| Trae Young (10)
| Wells Fargo Center20,836
| 17–42
|- style="background:#fcc;"
| 60
| February 26
| Orlando
| 
| Trae Young (37)
| De'Andre Hunter (11)
| Trae Young (11)
| State Farm Arena14,967
| 17–43
|- style="background:#cfc;"
| 61
| February 28
| Brooklyn
| 
| John Collins (33)
| John Collins (13)
| Trae Young (14)
| State Farm Arena17,034
| 18–43
|- style="background:#cfc;"
| 62
| February 29
| Portland
| 
| Trae Young (25)
| John Collins (10)
| Trae Young (15)
| State Farm Arena17,765
| 19–43

|- style="background:#fcc;"
| 63
| March 2
| Memphis
| 
| Trae Young (19)
| Hunter, Jones (7)
| Kevin Huerter (4)
| State Farm Arena16,207
| 19–44
|- style="background:#fcc;"
| 64
| March 6
| @ Washington
| 
| Cam Reddish (28)
| John Collins (10)
| Kevin Huerter (11)
| Capital One Arena17,856
| 19–45
|- style="background:#fcc;"
| 65
| March 7
| @ Memphis
| 
| John Collins (27)
| Dewayne Dedmon (10)
| Kevin Huerter (6)
| FedExForum17,117
| 19–46
|- style="background:#cfc;"
| 66
| March 9
| Charlotte
| 
| Trae Young (31)
| Collins, Hunter (11)
| Trae Young (16)
| State Farm Arena14,399
| 20–46
|- style="background:#fcc;"
| 67
| March 11
| New York
| 
| Trae Young (42)
| John Collins (15)
| Trae Young (11)
| State Farm Arena15,393
| 20–47
 
|- style="background:#;"
| 68
| March 14
| Cleveland
| 
|
|
|
| State Farm Arena
|
|- style="background:#;"
| 69
| March 16
| @ New Orleans
| 
|
|
|
| Smoothie King Center
|
|- style="background:#;"
| 70
| March 18
| Oklahoma City
| 
|
|
|
| State Farm Arena
|
|- style="background:#;"
| 71
| March 20
| Washington
| 
|
|
|
| State Farm Arena
|
|- style="background:#;"
| 72
| March 21
| @ Philadelphia
| 
|
|
|
| Wells Fargo Center
|
|- style="background:#;"
| 73
| March 25
| @ Golden State
| 
|
|
|
| Chase Center
|
|- style="background:#;"
| 74
| March 26
| @ Sacramento
| 
|
|
|
| Golden 1 Center
|
|- style="background:#;"
| 75
| March 28
| @ Utah
| 
|
|
|
| Vivint Smart Home Arena
|
|- style="background:#;"
| 76
| March 31
| New Orleans
| 
|
|
|
| State Farm Arena
|
|- style="background:#;"
| 77
| April 3
| Charlotte
| 
|
|
|
| State Farm Arena
|
|- style="background:#;"
| 78
| April 5
| @ Charlotte
| 
|
|
|
| Spectrum Center
|
|- style="background:#;"
| 79
| April 7
| Detroit
| 
|
|
|
| State Farm Arena
|
|- style="background:#;"
| 80
| April 10
| @ Toronto
| 
|
|
|
| Scotiabank Arena
|
|- style="background:#;"
| 81
| April 12
| @ Milwaukee
| 
|
|
|
| Fiserv Forum
|
|- style="background:#;"
| 82
| April 15
| Cleveland
| 
|
|
|
| State Farm Arena
|

Transactions

Trades

Free agents

Re-signed

Additions

Subtractions

Notes

References

Atlanta Hawks seasons
Atlanta Hawks
Atlanta Hawks